Yours is the studio album by jazz vocalist Sara Gazarek.
Gazarek's debut album was released by Native Language Music on August 23, 2005. The album peaked at number 10 on Billboard Top Jazz Albums chart.

Track listing

Personnel
 Sara Gazarek - Vocal
 Erik Kertes - Bass
 Josh Nelson - Piano
 Matt Slocum - Drums

Charts

External links
All About Jazz - CD/LP Track Review - Sara Gazarek | Yours
JazzTimes - Yours Sara Gazarek — By Christopher Loudon

References

Sara Gazarek albums
2005 debut albums